Gatjil Djerrkura OAM (Yolŋu Matha:Gätjil Djerrkura) (30 June 1949 – 26 May 2004) was an Aboriginal leader and indigenous spokesman in the Northern Territory and Australia.

He was a senior elder of the Wangurri Aboriginal clan of the Yolngu people. He was responsible for a number of traditional and ceremonial activities on behalf of his clan and the East Arnhem Land/Yirrkala Aboriginal community.

He served as Chairperson of the Aboriginal and Torres Strait Islander Commission (ATSIC), appointed on 6 December 1996 to 2000.

In 1984 he was awarded the Medal of the Order of Australia (OAM) for his services to the Aboriginal community.

His son Nathan Djerrkura played for Geelong and the Western Bulldogs in the Australian Football League.

Positions
Chairman of the Batchelor College Council, NT
Director of the Board of the Indigenous Land Corporation
Director of the Board of the Land Enterprise Australia 
member of the Council for Aboriginal reconciliation 
General Manager of Yirrkala Business Enterprises in Nhulunbuy
Chairperson of the Aboriginal and Torres Strait Islander Commercial Development Corporation
Director of the Henry Walker Group

Further reading
 

1949 births
2004 deaths
People from the Northern Territory
Recipients of the Medal of the Order of Australia
Australian indigenous rights activists
Yolngu people